Stefan Perlström (born 18 May 1956) is a retired Swedish ice hockey player. Perlström was part of the Djurgården Swedish champions' team of 1983 and 1989. Perlström made 295 Elitserien appearances for Djurgården.

References

Swedish ice hockey defencemen
Djurgårdens IF Hockey players
1956 births
Living people